Teaneck Armory at 1799 Teaneck Road is an armory and arena located on a  site in Teaneck, New Jersey. It is owned and operated by the New Jersey National Guard.

History
The facility was completed in 1936 at a cost of $1 million. It was designed by Louis S. Kaplan (1896–1964), who as a young architect won a competition to design the Trenton War Memorial and after its dedication became the leading state architect until the early 1960s, designing or adapting many of its armories.

From 1967–68, the arena was the home of the New Jersey Americans of the American Basketball Association, the team that later became today's Brooklyn Nets. In 1968, the Americans were forced to forfeit a playoff game against the Kentucky Colonels because a circus group had rented the armory that week and the alternate location selected for the game, Long Island Arena in Commack, New York, had a floor in such poor condition that it was deemed unplayable.

Over the years the expansive floor and high-ceilinged space has been used for numerous film shoots, including Sweet and Lowdown, You've Got Mail, Bogus, and Stonewall. The armory has also hosted concerts, three-quarter midget car races, Boy Scout jamborees, professional wrestling, rallies (including a November 6, 1960 campaign rally by presidential candidate John F. Kennedy), circuses, indoor soccer and various military uses. It has also been used for ceremonies and celebrations commemorating Eid ul-Adha.

National Guard
The Teaneck Armory can be distinguished by the M42 Duster anti-aircraft vehicle and the M728 Combat Engineer Vehicle facing Teaneck Road. During 2005, the major units of the 50th Main Support Battalion assigned to drill at the Armory were deployed for service in Iraq and Kuwait, along with many other units of the New Jersey National Guard. Other elements of the New Jersey National Guard based at the Teaneck Armory have been deployed to Afghanistan, Guantanamo Bay, and Kosovo, among other places. Additionally, a squadron of the New Jersey Wing of the Civil Air Patrol is located at the Armory.

Flag
In 2010, the armory unfurled its first garrison flag since 1936. Received as donation, the flag had hung over Wall Street office building for 21 days after the September 2001 attacks. 15 feet wide and 20 feet long, it weighs 50 pounds.

See also

Jersey City Armory
Paterson Armory

References

External links
 Teaneck Virtual Village - links to articles about the Armory
 Soccer Coliseum - indoor sports programs. Web site features interior shot of facility

American Basketball Association venues
Basketball venues in New Jersey
Teaneck, New Jersey
Indoor arenas in New Jersey
Sports venues in New Jersey
New Jersey Nets
Armories in New Jersey
Military installations in New Jersey
Buildings and structures in Bergen County, New Jersey
Indoor soccer venues in the United States
1936 establishments in New Jersey